The California Maritime Academy Corps of Cadets is the undergraduate student body at the California Maritime Academy.  As a State Maritime Academy, as required by Title 46 Part 310 of the Code of Federal Regulations students are considered Cadets, required to wear uniforms, and utilize a demerit-based disciplinary system.  Participation in the Corps of Cadets is mandatory; participation in the Navy Reserve Merchant Marine program is optional.  Cadets still utilize Merchant Marine Navy-style uniforms, customs, and traditions.  Based on academic majors cadets are organized into Squads, Sections, Divisions and Companies which regularly muster in Morning Formations multiple times a week, as well as stand watches on campus and aboard the training ship.

Overview 

All undergraduate students at the California Maritime Academy are required to participate in the Corps of Cadets. This requirement comes from the Title 46 Part 310 of the Code of Federal Regulations which requires all cadets who are pursuing licensing as a deck or engineering officer in the United States Merchant Marine to participate in a cadet program.

Military options
There is no armed service obligation attached to graduation from the California Maritime Academy. However, financial aid and additional career opportunities exist for those students who choose to participate in any of the several military programs available on the CMA campus:

Coast Guard – Auxiliary University Program, Maritime Academy Graduate Program
Navy / Merchant Marine – Strategic Sealift Officer Program
Navy – Reserve Officer Training Corps
Marine Corps – Reserve Officer Training Corps
Air Force - Reserve Officer Training Corps

History
The California Nautical School was established in 1929, when California State Assembly Bill No. 253 was signed into law by Governor C. C. Young. The bill authorized the creation of the school, the appointment of a Board of Governors to manage the school and the acquisition of a training vessel. The school's mission was "to give practical and theoretical instruction in navigation, seamanship, steam engines, gas engines, and electricity in order to prepare young men to serve as officers in the American Merchant Marine." By 1930, a training vessel and a school site was acquired; the original location of what would become California Maritime Academy was California City (now Tiburon, California) in the San Francisco Bay Area.  This established the Corps of Cadets at the California Maritime Academy.

In January 1990 RADM John J. Ekelund, then president, resigned amidst allegations of mistreatment of the academy's first female cadets.  This led to a gradual elimination of military regimentation of cadets' life and training, as well as leading to becoming part of the California State University System.  After becoming a campus of the California State University system, mandatory participation in the Navy Reserve Merchant Marine was eliminated with the introduction of academic majors that were not focused on becoming a licensed Merchant Marine or Reserve Naval Officer.

Organization

The California Maritime Academy Corps of Cadets is a cadet-run organization, consisting of over 1000 members, modeled after the Naval Regiment of Midshipmen.  The Corps of Cadets is supervised by the Office of Leadership Development who establish baseline regulations for the running of the Corps of Cadets.  The day-to-day activities, such as formations and watchstanding are run primarily by the cadets.

Office of Leadership Development

The Office of Leadership Development is Commandant of Cadets, who is appointed by California Maritime Academy and is a paid staff and faculty member. The Commandant is typically a retired Senior Officer from a maritime service, either the Navy, Marines, or Coast Guard.

The Commandant is assisted by a Company Commandants who oversee the cadet companies and one Lead Company Commandant for Leader Development. There is also an administrative support staff.  In the past, the Commandant staff had Chief Petty Officers who mentored cadets on professional development and responsibility.

The campus President, Commandants, Company Commandants, Commanding Officer of the Training Ship, licensed faculty, and Training Ship staff, many of whom are Commissioned Officers of the United States Maritime Service also wear the Merchant Marine uniforms to set the standard for cadets to look up to, as well as develop cadets leadership and professional abilities.

Partial list of Commandants of Cadets

Corps of Cadets
The California Maritime Academy Corps of Cadets is organized on the level of an Naval Regiment of Midshipmen.  The same uniforms and insignia are used, with the exception of using the title of the rank. The following is the structure as of the 2014-2015 Academic Year:

Corps Executive Staff
 Corps Commander (6 Gold Bars)
 Corps [Executive Officer] (5 Gold Bars)
 Corps [Chief of Staff] (5 Gold Bars)
 Academic Training Officer (5 Gold Bars)
 Corps Information & Technology Officer (5 Gold Bars)
 ASCMA President (6 Gold Bars)
 Senior Hall Director (6 Gold Bars)
 
Company Staff
 Company Commanding Officer (5 Gold Bars)
 Company Chief (5 Gold Bars)
 Company Executive Officer (4 Gold Bars)
 Company 1st Assistant/2nd Mate (4 Gold Bars)
 Company 2nd Assistant/3rd Mate (3 Gold Bars)
 Company 3rd Assistant (3 Gold Bars)
 
Division Staff
 Division Commanding Officer (4 Gold Bars)
 Division Executive Officer (3 Gold Bars)
 Division Officer (2 Gold Bars)
 Section Leader (1 Gold Bars with Blue Breaks)
 Squad Leader (1 Gold Bars with Red Breaks)

All seniors not in an officer position wear the rank of Cadet Ensign (1 Gold Bar).  Previously underclassmen were considered equivalent to enlisted ranks, and depending in position wore insignia of a Petty Officer or Chief Petty Officer.  Currently, cadets in non-leadership positions wear sleeve striping and rank insignia that corresponds to their academic class standing.

Freshman Training 
Freshman cadets attend an orientation that familiarizes them with the campus layout and policies.  Cadets are no longer required to undergo any training in drill or physical training.  Cadets no longer learn marching, but still learn facing movements for Morning Formation and Colors.

Cadet awards
Only awards received from California Maritime Academy, awards from another Maritime Academy if a transfer student, and awards from Military service are worn on the uniform.  Reserve Officer Training Corps, Civil Air Patrol, and other program awards are not allowed to be worn on the CMA cadet uniform.  Following Navy Uniform regulations, ribbons are worn three to a row, with no spaces in between the rows.

Meritorious Awards
  Meritorious Service Award 
  Distinguished Cadet Award
  Cadet of the Month

Academic Awards
  President's List 
  Dean's List

Training Awards
  GOLDEN BEAR Award
  Most Helpful Upper-Class Cadet Award
  Best Shipmate Award 
  Gold Medal Leadership Award
  Cruise Award
  International Experience Award

Conduct Award
  Admiral's Leadership Award 
  Good Conduct

Organizational Awards
  Corps Officer
  ASCMA Council 
  Resident Assistant
  Section Leader/Squad Leader 
  Varsity Letter
  Drill Team/Color Guard
  Community Emergency Response Team 
  Community Service
 Cadet Ambassador Program

Notable Alumni of the Corps of Cadets
Graduated Cadets who exemplified the Core Values through their meritorious service in a position of significant responsibility.

 Ensign Richard B. Wilkie (1939) died June 21, 1941, serving on the crew of USS Medusa until he became ill with tuberculosis of the spine.  He was awarded the Merchant Marine Defense Bar and American Defense Service Medal.
 Ensign Henry D. McNabb, USN (1939) died September 9, 1943, killed by German artillery while serving on the crew of USS Arcturus.  At the time he was operating LCM 15 in a four-man crew and five enlisted men.  While assisting a British Landing Craft at Blue Beach, LCM 15 came under fire from a German 88 mm shore battery which killed Ensign McNabb and five of his men, wounding three of the other four men and sinking the LCM 15.  He was posthumously awarded the Silver Star and Purple Heart for his actions. Firehouse #14 in Stockton, CA is on a street named for him.
 Chief Mate James M. Hendy, USMS (1941), died November 19, 1944, while serving on the crew of the Liberty Ship SS Gilbert Stuart.  An enemy air attack killed five crew members and one navy gunner.  Based on his Merchant Marine Service he is eligible for the Merchant Marine Mariner's Medal, Merchant Marine Combat Bar with star, Merchant Marine Atlantic War Zone Medal, Merchant Marine Pacific War Zone Medal and the Merchant Marine World War II Victory Medal.
 Captain John Clague, USN (1940) while serving on the crew of the USS Hamilton, received the Bronze Star for service in the liberation of the Philippines.
 Captain Noel V. Bird, USN (1939) served aboard two Attack Transports and was involved in fourteen amphibious landings in North Africa and throughout the Pacific during World War II.
 Captain Edward Franklin, USCG (1940) served in the Merchant Marine Service commanding the Liberty Ship SS Bret Harte.  Later commissioned in the Coast Guard where he was awarded the Bronze Star and Republic of Vietnam Gallantry Cross.
 Captain Joey W. Hegeman, USN (1956) served as the Commanding Officer of USS Umpqua, later in the Naval Intelligence, and finally in the Department of Defense Inspector General.  He was awarded the Bronze Star with Combat V and the Defense Meritorious Service Medal.
 Commander Donald D. Bloom, USN (1955) served as a Naval Aviator on five different aircraft carriers, including Executive Officer of the USS Inchon and was awarded the Air Medal with Gold Star.
 Captain James Coleman, USNR (1955-E) served as an Engineering Duty Officer, Ship Superintendent at the Charleston Naval Shipyard and then as an Engineering Officer on the USS Boston.  He was later the program engineer for Polaris Class submarines, Submarine Safety Program, the Board of Inspection and Survey,  and a founding member of the Navy's Environmental Protection Program.  His last assignment was as Program Manager of the Navy's Submarine Maintenance and Material Management Office of the Naval Sea Systems Command. He received the Navy's Meritorious Civilian Service Award.
 Third Mate Sam A. Bondy, Jr. (67-D), serving on S.S. Badger State Ammunition ship under contract to the Military Sea Transportation Service was killed on December 26, 1969, when an explosion occurred while en route to Vietnam.  The crew was forced to abandon ship in a gale and the liferaft capsized.
 Staff Sergeant Cassell J. Wiggins, USMC (alumnus) served in Iraq and Afghanistan as an Explosive Ordnance Disposal Technician, and was awarded the Bronze Star with Combat V for actions after his convoy was ambushed.  He exposed himself to enemy fire to clear a path to attend the wounded Marines.
 Commander Albert S. McLemore, USN (1949-E) Commanding Officer of the USS Frank E. Evans that was lost in a collision.  He was tried at Court-martial for "hazarding a vessel" but acquitted.
 Captain John Bloomingdale (1989-MT) on the Matson container ship Manukai was awarded the Coast Guard Meritorious Public Service Award for the rescue of three men from a sailboat caught in Hurricane Julio 414 miles northeast of Oahu, Aug. 10, 2014.
 Third Mate Justin Moore (2013-MT) on the Matson container ship Manukai was awarded the Coast Guard Meritorious Public Service Award for the rescue of three men from a sailboat caught in Hurricane Julio 414 miles northeast of Oahu, Aug. 10, 2014.
 Captain Kate McCue (2000-BA) First American female mega cruise ship captain with Celebrity Cruises.

See also

 United States Maritime Administration
 United States service academies
 Maritime Academy
 United States Merchant Marine
 Senior Military College
 Texas A&M University Corps of Cadets
 Virginia Tech Corps of Cadets

References

External links
Official website
Official athletics website

M
Maritime colleges in the United States
Military academies of the United States
Universities and colleges in Solano County, California
Schools accredited by the Western Association of Schools and Colleges
Military education and training in the United States
ROTC programs in the United States
Schools in Vallejo, California
1929 establishments in California